Jefferson School of Law may refer to:

 Thomas Jefferson School of Law in San Diego, California
 Jefferson School of Law (Louisville, Kentucky), a defunct school which merged into the University of Louisville School of Law in 1950
 Jefferson Law School, a defunct school in Dallas, Texas